Sigma Delta Pi is the National Collegiate Hispanic Honor Society (La Sociedad Nacional Honoraria Hispánica). It was established on November 14, 1919, at the University of California at Berkeley.

History 

The Society recognizes seven founding members, but acknowledges an undergraduate UC-Berkeley student named Ruth Barnes as its organizer and first president. On Friday, November 14, 1919, Barnes invited six other students of Spanish to her residence at 2545 Dwight Way to start what would eventually become the largest collegiate foreign language honor society in the U.S. Those six students who joined Barnes at her home:
Miriam Burt
Ferdinand V. Custer
Anna Krause
Margaret Priddle
Ruth Rhodes
Vera Stump 

Today, November is celebrated annually as National Charter Month, and May 1 is commemorated as Sigma Delta Pi Day.

Unlike many collegiate honor societies, Sigma Delta Pi was conceived, planned and founded entirely by students, and for the first ten years of its existence they directed its activities, driving it to become a national society with sixteen chapters at premier universities across the United States. Growth has been steady over the ensuing decades, adding 50 to 100 chapters every ten years, until today when the society is represented by over 625 chapters and over 180,000 lifetime initiates.

Its mission:
To honor those who seek and attain excellence in the study of Spanish language and in the study of the literature and the culture of the Spanish-speaking people;
To honor those who strive to make the Hispanic contributions to modern culture better known to the English-speaking peoples;
To encourage college and university students to acquire a greater interest in, and a deeper understanding of Hispanic culture; and 
To foster friendly relations and mutual respect between the nations of Hispanic speech and those of English speech.
These four have guided the work of the Society for a Century. Over the ensuing years, along with other slight wording changes, a fifth purpose was added:
To serve its membership in ways which will contribute to the attainment of the goals and ideals of the society.

In 2017, Sigma Delta Pi launched La Sociedad Honoraria de la Lengua Española, an honor society for Spanish students in two-year colleges.

Insignia 
Its insignia is the royal seal of Ferdinand and Isabella that represents Castille, León and Aragón.

The Society's colors are red and gold and its flower is the red carnation.

The Society publishes once per year its newsletter called Entre Nosotros.

Chapters 
Sigma Delta Pi currently has over 625 chapters, 368 of these are considered active—a chapter that holds at least one induction of new members during a three-year period.

The Society maintains a chapter list on their national website.

Membership 
There are three classes of membership in Sigma Delta Pi: active, alumnus and honorary. Election to the Order of the Discoverers and/or the Order of Don Quijote constitutes two other categories of membership, both of which are considered prestigious and above the three aforementioned categories of membership. Also, whereas active and honorary membership candidates are screened only by the local chapter, candidates for the Orders must be nominated through the national headquarters.

Student members are invited to join based on the basis of superior academic achievement in strict accordance with the criteria set forth by the Association of College Honor Societies. These include:
 They must have completed at least three years, or the equivalent, of college Spanish, including at least three semester hours of a third-year course in Hispanic literature or Hispanic culture and civilization.  Those students enrolled in these courses are eligible for membership if the instructor will certify that their work is a B quality or better;
 Their grades in all Spanish courses must average at least 3.0 on a 4.0 scale;
 They must rank in the upper 35% of their class (sophomore, junior, senior) or in cases where an institution does not record class rank, maintain a 3.20 cumulative GPA;
They must have completed at least three semesters or five quarters of college work;
 They must show genuine interest in things Hispanic and be of good moral character.

Organization
The Society has a National President, an Executive Director, five Regional Vice Presidents and a Board of Student Advisers.  The Executive Director and the Executive Committee Member-at-Large are appointed, the National President and Vice Presidents are nominated and elected by the active chapters, and the members of the Board of Student Advisers apply for Board membership and are selected by current Board Members and the Executive Committee.  The Society is governed by an Executive Council consisting of the seven aforementioned officials, the Immediate Past President, the Presidents Emeriti and the Executive Committee Member-at-Large.

Each active chapter is required to have a faculty sponsor who is also a member of Sigma Delta Pi and is responsible for overseeing the activities of the chapter.  Also, each chapter is encouraged to elect student officers to assist with the direction of the chapter.

External links
 Sigma Delta Pi homepage
 Association of College Honor Societies: Sigma Delta Pi

See also
Sociedad Honoraria de la Lengua Española

References

Honor societies
Literary societies
Hispanic and Latino organizations
Student organizations established in 1919
1919 establishments in California
Student societies in the United States
Association of College Honor Societies